Hyposcada illinissa, the illinissa glasswing, is a species of butterfly of the family Nymphalidae. It is found from Colombia to Bolivia. The habitat consists of lowland rainforests at altitudes between 100 and 1,100 metres.

Subspecies
H. i. illinissa (Brazil: Amazonas)
H. i. abida (Hewitson, 1871) (Colombia)
H. i. aesion (Godman & Salvin, 1878) (Panama, Ecuador)
H. i. brisotis (Haensch, 1909) (Bolivia)
H. i. cynthia Fox, 1941 (Ecuador)
H. i. dolabella (Hewitson, 1876) (Bolivia)
H. i. dujardini Brévignon, 1993 (Guianas)
H. i. ida Haensch, 1903 (Ecuador)
H. i. idina Haensch, 1905 (Peru)
H. i. ilerdinoides (Staudinger, [1884]) (Brazil: Amazonas)
H. i. margarita Fox, 1941 (Peru)
H. i. napirida Zikán, 1941 (Brazil: Amazonas)
H. i. napoensis Vitale & Bollino, 2001 (Ecuador)
H. i. sinilia (Herrich-Schäffer, 1865) (Colombia)
H. i. tundayme Martinez, 2008 (Ecuador)

References

Butterflies described in 1851
Ithomiini
Fauna of Brazil
Nymphalidae of South America
Taxa named by William Chapman Hewitson